John Jeffreys may refer to:

 John R.F. Jeffreys (1916–1944), British mathematician and World War II codebreaker
 John Gwyn Jeffreys (1809–1885), British conchologist and malacologist
 J. G. Jeffreys (1893–?), Australian schoolteacher who moved to England and founded Bryanston School in Dorset
 John Jeffreys (died 1689), British Member of Parliament for Brecon and Breconshire
 John Jeffreys (died 1715) (c. 1659–1715), British Member of Parliament for Breconshire, Marlborough and Radnorshire
 John Jeffreys (1706–1766), British Member of Parliament for Breconshire and Dartmouth

See also
John Jeffrey (disambiguation)
John Jeffries (disambiguation)